Happy Hardy and Heer is a 2020 Bollywood musical romantic drama film directed by Raka, produced by Deepshikha Deshmukh and Sabita Manakchand, starring Himesh Reshammiya in a double role for the first time and Punjabi actress Sonia Mann.

Plot
Happy, a lovable loser, is smitten by his childhood friend Heer. Though she is fond of him, she is yet to express her feelings for him. When she moves to London, Happy follows her there. Though he goes there on the pretext of getting a job, his real goal is to woo Heer. In London, she meets Hardy, who is born and raised there. While Happy comes across as a happy-go-lucky guy, who fails at everything he attempts, Hardy is a successful entrepreneur. Heer falls for the latter, a twist in the tale leads to a situation where she has to choose between her childhood friend and her ideal man.

Cast
 Himesh Reshammiya as Harpreet Singh Lamba aka Happy / Harshvardhan Bhatt aka Hardy (Double Role)
 Sonia Mann as Heer Randhawa
 Naresh Suri as Heer's father
 Manmeet Singh as Happy's maternal uncle
 Deep Mandeep
 Ashwin Dhar as Mr. Kapoor (married to Hardy's mother)
 Sejal Shah
 Trupti Khamkar as Latika
 David Shaw as Charles
 Nazzar Abdulla
 Raka as Shampy (cameo appearance)

Production

Filming
The film was shot in places such as Glasgow, Edinburgh and Greenock of Scotland and were filmed from 15 April 2019 to 15 May 2019.

Promotion
The makers of the film took a different approach to promote the film, deciding to organize Happy Hardy Heer concerts in 12 different cities. On 16 November 2019, the first concert was organized in Pune. On 20 November, a concert was organized in Surat followed by Mathura, Vadodara, Jaipur, Kolkata, Mumbai, Ahmedabad, Mehsana, etc.

Release
The film is produced by HR Musik and EYKA Films. On 11 July 2019, Tips Music uploaded the trailer on YouTube while Reshammiya posted the first official poster of the film on Instagram. On 16 July 2019, a musical teaser of the film was released. And finally, the film was released on 31 January 2020.

Soundtrack

The soundtrack was composed by Reshammiya, with lyrics by Vishal Mishra, Kumaar, Shabbir Ahmed, Reshammiya and Aaryan Tiwari. The soundtrack will consist of songs sung by Reshammiya, Arijit Singh, Shreya Ghoshal, Jubin Nautiyal, Harshdeep Kaur, Asees Kaur, Navraj Hans, Anusha Mani, Ranu Mondal and Rituraj Mohanty. The first song of the album "Heeriye" was released on Reshammiya's birthday on 23 July 2019. The song "Teri Meri Kahani" was released on 11 September 2019. Ashiqui Mein Teri 2.0 is the remake of Ashiqui Mein Teri from 36 China Town originally composed and recreated by Reshammiya. For the song "Duggi", Reshammiya collaborated with Shannon K, an American singer-songwriter, daughter of singer Kumar Sanu, who also marked her debut as playback singer in Bollywood.

Track listing

Soundtrack Response
The soundtrack was successful. "Teri Meri Kahani" went viral and was viewed over 23 million types on YouTube. "Teri Meri Kahani" became the second most searched song and most searched Hindi song on Google in 2019.

Critical reception
Harshada Rege from Times of India gave it 3/5 and called it "Music makes this love triangle an entertaining watch."

Popular film critic Subhash K Jha said, "Himesh Reshammiya not only plays a double role, but he also makes sure his presence is felt in every frame even when he is not there."

Sonil Dedhia from Mid-Day gave 3/5 and stated "Happy Hardy and Heer is a harmless, watchable film – sad, because it could have been better. It has its moments in the first half, while the second looks a bit dragged. With well- crafted romantic and intense moments, the film is a breezy love story." Umesh Punwani from Koimoi gave it just 1/5, stating "All said and done, Happy Hardy And Heer is just yet another Himesh Reshammiya film which hardly makes any sense about why it even exists."

Nandini Ramnath from Scroll.in gave it 2/5 and stated "There is barely anything new in the situations between Heer and the two men in love with her. Besides, both the leads look a bit too seasoned to be playing the love-at-first-sight game. Despite the high volume at which the dialogue is delivered – Reshammiya is subtlety itself compared to Sonia Mann – almost nothing resonates.". The Economic Times gave it 3/5 and stated "An amusing watch despite wafer-thin plot & weak screenplay"

Box office
The film collected  on its opening day. The film had a lifetime collection of ₹8 crore at the box office.

References

External links
 
 

2020 films
Films scored by Himesh Reshammiya
2020s Hindi-language films
2020 romantic drama films
HR Musik films
Indian romantic drama films
Films shot in Glasgow
Indian musical drama films
2020s musical drama films